Astolfo (also Astolpho, Estous, and Estouls) is a fictional character in the Matter of France where he is one of Charlemagne's paladins.  He is the son of Otto, the King of England (possibly referring to Charles' contemporary Offa of Mercia), and is a cousin to Orlando and Rinaldo, and a descendant of Charles Martel. While Astolfo's name appeared in the Old French chanson de geste The Four Sons of Aymon, his first major appearance was in the anonymous early fourteenth-century Franco-Venetian epic poem La Prise de Pampelune.  He was subsequently a major character (typically humorous) in Italian Renaissance romance epics, such as Morgante by Luigi Pulci, Orlando Innamorato by Matteo Maria Boiardo, and Orlando Furioso by Ludovico Ariosto.

Astolfo in Orlando Furioso

When first introduced, Duke Astolfo is trapped in the form of a myrtle tree by means of the evil sorceress Alcina's magic. When Ruggiero attempts to tether his hippogriff to the unlucky man, Astolfo protests, lamenting his fate. Although the two converse at length, Ruggiero does not heed the duke's advice to avoid Alcina and he soon becomes bewitched as well. Both are, however, rescued and returned to normal by Melissa, the good sorceress.

Astolfo possesses various magical equipment which he employs throughout his adventures. His magic lance can knock his opponents from their horses with the slightest touch, and his magic book contains spells capable of breaking any enchantment. He also owns a magic horn whose blast is so loud that it causes all enemies to flee in terror and rides upon a horse named Rabicano. This magical horse is made of hurricane and flame, feeds on air and it treads so lightly that it doesn't leave footprints in the sand, and when it runs at full speed it can run faster than an arrow.

Astolfo uses his magic horn to capture the giant Caligorante, and then parades the giant from town to town, forcing him to act as his beast of burden. He also defeats Orillo, a robber who could not be killed because he was enchanted to regenerate from any wounds he received. Even severed limbs would reattach themselves. Astolfo loans his golden lance and Rabicano to Bradamante for a short time while he rides the hippogriff in search of Orlando's lost wits.

Astolfo travels to Ethiopia where he met Senapo (Prester John), the emperor of that land. In a situation similar to the story of Phineus from Greek mythology, Senapo is blind and plagued by harpies who attack him whenever he tries to eat a meal, spilling the glasses and befouling the food. Astolfo blows his horn and chases the harpies through the entrance to Hell, and seals them inside. He flies the hippogriff to the summit of the mountain of Terrestrial Paradise, where he meets Saint John the Apostle, who explains how he could return Orlando to his senses. He flies in Elijah's  flaming chariot to the moon, where all things lost upon the earth end up, and locates Orlando's wits in a bottle. He returns to earth and gains Senapo's aid in the defense of Paris from the Saracen invaders.

Origin of the name
It derives from the Germanic name Haistulf, a name composed of haist (of uncertain meaning, perhaps "furious", "violent") or perhaps ast ("rod", "spear"), and vulf ("wolf")

In modern times

Science
A species of extinct rail was named in honor of Astolfo: Gallirallus astolfoi, or Astolfo's rail.

Television
Astolfo is a major character in the Japanese television anime series Fate/Apocrypha as the Rider of the Black faction.

Video games
Astolfo appears in the video game Fire Emblem as a Thief (as in Fire Emblem: The Binding Blade.)

Astolfo appears in the video game Fate/Grand Order as a Rider (as in Fate/Apocrypha, see above) and, later on, also as a Saber. His popularity as a character in the Fate media franchise was deemed to surpass the popularity of the original in modern times. This phenomenon was also observed for other characters in the Fate franchise in a study, which led the authors to name it the "Astolfo Effect".

References

Ariosto, Ludovico; and Waldman, Guido (translator)  (28 January 1999). Orlando Furioso. Oxford. .

Fictional characters introduced in the 14th century
Matter of France
Fictional knights
Characters in Orlando Innamorato and Orlando Furioso